Edward Arthur Cummings (born June 29, 1941 – September 25, 2020) was an American football linebacker in the American Football League. He played college football at Stanford.

Collegiate career
Cummings was a two-way player for the Stanford Cardinal as a fullback and as a linebacker. He led the Cardinal in tackles in his junior and senior seasons and was named a third-team All-American at fullback as a senior. Cummings was inducted into Stanford's Athletic Hall of Fame in 2005.

Professional career
Cummings was tried out for the New York Giants and was invited to training camp, but was cut before the start of the 1963 season after injuring his shoulder. After being cut he enrolled in the Columbia University School of Social Work and finished his degree in the following offseason. Cummings signed with the New York Jets of the American Football League for the 1964 season after requesting a tryout with the team and became the team's starting linebacker late in the season. Cummings was traded to the Denver Broncos in the offseason and played in all 14 of the team's games in 1965.

Personal life
Cummings son, Joe Cummings, played linebacker in the NFL. Cummings attended The University of Montana School of Law after retiring from football. Cummings died on September 25, 2020.

References

1941 births
2020 deaths
American football linebackers
Stanford Cardinal football players
New York Jets players
Denver Broncos players
Players of American football from Montana
New York Giants players
American football fullbacks
People from Anaconda, Montana
Columbia University School of Social Work alumni
University of Montana alumni